Mostene (Μοστήνη), also called Mosteni or Mostenoi (Μοστηνοί), or Mostina (Μόστινα), or Mustene or Moustene (Μουστήνη), is a Roman and Byzantine era city in the Hyrcanian plain of ancient Lydia. The town minted its own coin of which many examples exist today. In 17 CE the city was hit by an earthquake and was assisted with relief from Tiberius.

There is debate, based on a line in Tacitus, over whether Mostene was a Macedonian Colony. Cranmer argues for the Macedonian ethnos while Getzel M. Cohen argues for a native Lydian population.

Its site is tentatively located near Sancaklıbozköy in Asiatic Turkey.

Mostene was also the site of a Bishopric. The diocese belonged to the ecclesiastical province of Sardis and remains  a titular see of the Roman Catholic Church to this day . The diocese was suffragan of the ecclesiastical province of Sardis under Patriarchate of Constantinople.

References

Catholic titular sees in Asia
Dioceses established in the 1st century
Ancient Greek archaeological sites in Turkey
Populated places in ancient Lydia
Roman towns and cities in Turkey
Populated places of the Byzantine Empire
History of Manisa Province
Şehzadeler District